William George St Clair Dixon, CBE (born October 9, 1939) was  the Dean of Barbados from 2000 until 2004.

He was educated at the University of the West Indies and ordained in 1975. He was  Priest in charge then Rector at St. Christopher, Barbados from 1977 to 2000.

References

1939 births
University of the West Indies alumni
Christ Church, Barbados
Saint Michael, Barbados
Deans of Barbados
Commanders of the Order of the British Empire
Living people